The Flats Industrial Railroad  is a Class III railroad that provides short-line commercial/industrial switching service in Cleveland, Cuyahoga County, Ohio, primarily with CSX Transportation and the Norfolk Southern Railway.

History 
Trains have run in the Cuyahoga Valley since the 1880s. In 1880, the Valley Railway began operations, transporting coal to Cleveland, Akron, and Canton from the Tuscarawas River Valley and providing passenger service along the way. After a decade of operation, the Valley Railway became part of the Baltimore & Ohio Railroad. In the 20th century, competition from automobiles, trucks, and buses caused the decline of both freight and passenger service.

Right-of-way ownership shifted over the years from Valley Railway to the Cleveland Terminal & Valley Railway (CT&V), to the Baltimore and Ohio Railroad, to the Chessie System.

Today 
Flats Industrial Railroad acquired its rails and right-of-way within the Flats District (Cleveland) from former Conrail. As of 2009, the Class III Short Line railroad operates as the Flats Industrial Railroad Company. The railroad operates on weekdays, reportedly around 7:00 to 10:00AM. At one time, they used to have a sand trans-loading business to keep themselves busy while not switching at Cleveland's Cereal Food Processors elevator. They also used to serve fatty oils and synthetic esters producer, "Werner G. Smith." They interchange with the Norfolk Southern in a yard between Fulton Road and W.41 Street in Cleveland, Ohio. The Cloggsville Line, operated by Norfolk Southern, serves that yard.

As recently as 2014, FIR had only two employees.

In April 2020, the railroad's primary customer, the Grain Craft flour mill on Merwin Avenue, announced it would be closing due to "challenging market dynamics and long-term supply chain obstacles."

Equipment 
Flats Industrial Railroad initially operated one switching locomotive, later adding a second locomotive, until 2021 when SW1200 #1202 was sold to the Davenport Industrial Railroad in Davenport, Iowa.

Locomotives 
EMD SW1500 #1222

Accidents
In 2005, FIR reported a single Highway-Rail Crossing incident, no other accidents, and no one killed or injured.  From 1996-2004 and 2006-2020, FIR did not report any accidents (train, highway-rail crossing, other incidents).

See also 

Cleveland railroad history
List of crossings of the Cuyahoga River

References

General References 

Ohio Department of Transportation

External links
  (channel NorfolkSouthernModel)

Ohio railroads
Transportation in Cuyahoga County, Ohio
Switching and terminal railroads
Spin-offs of Conrail
Rail transportation in Cleveland